Rhopobota antrifera is a species of moth of the family Tortricidae. It is found in China (Zhejiang, Fujian, Hubei, Guangxi, Guizhou) and Russia.

References

Moths described in 1935
Eucosmini